The BBC John Peel Sessions, 1990–1992 is an expanded version of the earlier release, The Peel Sessions by Babes in Toyland. It was produced by James Birt Whistle and released on 27 November 2001 by Cherry Red Records, which was also responsible for releasing Babes In Toyland's first live album, Minneapolism.

Track listing 
"Catatonic" - 2:53
"Ripe" - 3:36
"Primus" - 3:58
"Spit to See the Shine" - 2:40
"Pearl" - 2:03
"Dogg" - 5:11
"Laugh My Head Off" - 3:30
"Mad Pilot" - 2:50
"Handsome and Gretel" - 1:55
"Blood" - 3:05
"Mother" - 3:31
"Dirty" - 2:23
"Jungle Train" - 2:36
"Right Now" - 2:25
"Sometimes" - 3:43
"Magic Flute" - 3:20

Personnel
Kat Bjelland	 - 	Guitar, vocals
Lori Barbero	 - 	drums, vocals on "Primus","Dogg", and "Magic Flute"
Michelle Leon	 - 	Bass on tracks 1-12
Maureen Herman      -      Bass on Tracks 13-16

References

External links
[ Allmusic: The BBC John Peel Sessions, 1990-1992 ]

Babes in Toyland (band) compilation albums
Peel Sessions recordings
2001 live albums
2001 compilation albums
Grunge compilation albums
Live grunge albums